This is a list of the winning and nominated programs of the Primetime Emmy Award for Outstanding Special Visual Effects for a series, miniseries, film, or special. Since the award ceremony of 1998, the category has been divided into Special Visual Effects for a Series and Special Visual Effects for a Miniseries, Movie, or Special. In 1991, the Television Academy nominated four programs, but did not determine a winner.

Before becoming well-known directors, Neill Blomkamp, Gareth Edwards, and Robert Stromberg were nominees for the award.

Winners and nominations

1950s

1960s

1970s

1980s

1990s

2000s

2010s

2020s

Programs with multiple awards

7 awards
 Game of Thrones

3 awards
 Star Trek: The Next Generation
 Star Trek: Voyager

2 awards
 Battlestar Galactica 
 Boardwalk Empire
 The Mandalorian
 Star Trek: Enterprise

Programs with multiple nominations

9 nominations
 Star Trek: Voyager

8 nominations
 Game of Thrones
 Stargate SG-1
 Star Trek: The Next Generation

7 nominations
 Star Trek: Enterprise
 Vikings

6 nominations
 Battlestar Galactica
 Star Trek: Deep Space Nine

5 nominations
 The Walking Dead

4 nominations
 Black Sails
 Boardwalk Empire
 Star Trek
 Voyage to the Bottom of the Sea

3 nominations
 The Borgias
 The Crown
 Gotham
 The Handmaid's Tale
 Heroes
 Lost in Space
 The Man in the High Castle
 Stargate Universe
 Stranger Things
 Westworld
 The Young Indiana Jones Chronicles

2 nominations
 Agents of S.H.I.E.L.D.
 Band of Brothers
 Da Vinci's Demons
 Falling Skies
 Lost
 The Mandalorian
 Nightmares & Dreamscapes: From the Stories of Stephen King
 Rome
 Sherlock
 Stargate Atlantis
 Star Trek: Discovery
 Tom Clancy's Jack Ryan
 The Umbrella Academy
 The X-Files

Notes

References

External links
 

Special Visual Effects
Visual effects awards